Howard E. Zimmerman (July 5, 1926 – February 12, 2012) was a professor of chemistry at the University of Wisconsin–Madison. He was elected to the National Academy of Sciences in 1980 and the recipient of the 1986 American Institute of Chemists Chemical Pioneer Award.

Biography
Howard E. Zimmerman was a native of Connecticut. During World War II he served in the U.S. Armored Corps in Europe where he was a tank gunner. His final rank was technical sergeant. He obtained a B. S. in Chemistry in 1950 and a Ph.D. in 1953 both from Yale University. He was a Postdoctoral Research Fellow with a National Research Council fellowship from 1953 to 1954 working with R. B. Woodward (Harvard). From 1954 to 1960 he was assistant professor at Northwestern University. Beginning in 1960 he was Associate Professor and then Professor at the University of Wisconsin, and from 1990 he was Hilldale and A. C. Cope Professor of Chemistry. His publications number over 285 (including 11 chapters).

Zimmerman gave ACS Short Courses on organic quantum chemistry and molecular orbital theory. He authored a 1975 textbook entitled Quantum Mechanics for Organic Chemists. Zimmerman was the organizer of the 1972 IUPAC Photochemistry Symposium (Baden-Baden) and of five Pacifichem Symposia – the last being Pacifichem 2010.

Honors
 Phi Beta Kappa
 Sigma Xi
 1950 The Chittenden Award given to the top B.S. graduate in the Yale class of 1950
1971 The first Northeast ACS Award for Photochemistry
1976 The ACS James Flack Norris Award in Physical Organic Chemistry
1980 The Halpern Award of the New York Academy of Sciences
1980 Election to the National Academy of Sciences
1986 Recipient of the American Institute of Chemists Chemical Pioneer Award
1988 A Senior Alexander von Humboldt Award
1990 Hilldale Award in the Physical Sciences from the University of Wisconsin
 1991 Arthur C. Cope Scholar Award of the ACS
 2006 IUPAC Porter Medal for Photochemical Research

Selected bibliography
"The Stereochemistry of the Ketonization Reaction of Enols," Zimmerman, H. E. J. Org. Chem., 1955, 20, 549-557. 
"The Stereochemistry of the Ivanov and Reformatsky Reactions. I," Zimmerman, H. E.; Traxler, M. D. J. Am. Chem. Soc., 1957, 79, 1920-1923. 
"The Photochemical Rearrangement of 4,4-Diphenylcyclohexadienone. Paper I on a General Theory of Photochemical Reactions," Zimmerman, H. E.; Schuster, D. I. J. Am. Chem. Soc., 1961, 83, 4486-4487. 
"On Molecular Orbital Correlation Diagrams, the Occurrence of Möbius Systems in Cyclization Reactions, and Factors Controlling Ground and Excited State Reactions. I," Zimmerman, H. E. J. Am. Chem. Soc., 1966, 88, 1564-1565. 
"Photochemical Migratory Aptitudes in Cyclohexenones. Mechanistic and Exploratory Organic Photochemistry. XXIII," Zimmerman, H. E.; Rieke, R. D.; Scheffer, J. R. J. Am. Chem. Soc., 1967, 89, 2033-2047. 
"The Di-π-Methane Rearrangement. Interaction of Electronically Excited Vinyl Chromophores. Zimmerman, H. E.; Mariano, P. S. J. Am. Chem. Soc., 1969, 91, 1718-1727. 
"The Barrelene to Semibullvalene Transformation. Correlation of Excited State Potential Energy Surfaces With Reactivity. Mechanistic and Exploratory Organic Photochemistry. XLIV," Zimmerman, H. E.; Binkley, R. W.; Givens, R. S.; Sherwin, M. A.; Grunewald, G. L.; J. Am. Chem. Soc., 1969, 91, 3316-3323.  .
"The Möbius-Hückel Concept in Organic Chemistry. Application to Organic Molecules and Reactions," Zimmerman, H. E. Acc. Chem. Res., 1971, 4, 272-280. 
"Quantum Mechanics for Organic Chemists," Zimmerman, H. E. Academic Press, New York, 1975. 
"Some Theoretical Aspects of Organic Photochemistry," Zimmerman, H. E. Accts. of Chem. Research, 1982, 10, 312-317. 
"Kinetic Protonation of Enols, Enolates and Analogs; The Stereochemistry of Ketonization," Zimmerman, H. E.. Accounts of Chem. Res.', 1987, 20, 263-268. 
"Regioselectivity of the Birch Reduction", Zimmerman, H. E.; Wang, P. A., J. Am. Chem. Soc., 1993, 115, 2205-2216. 
"The Meta Effect in Organic Photochemistry; Mechanistic and Exploratory Organic Photochemistry", Zimmerman, H. E., J. Am. Chem. Soc. 1995, 117, 8988-8991. 
"Synthetic Aspects of the Di-π-methane Rearrangement", Zimmerman, H. E.; Armesto, D. Chem. Revs, 1996, 96, 3065-3112.  
"Energy Distribution and Redistribution and Chemical Reactivity. The Generalized Delta Overlap-Density Method for Ground State and Electron Transfer Reactions; A new Quantitative Counterpart of Electron Pushing”, Zimmerman, H. E.; Alabugin, I. V. J. Am. Chem. Soc. 2001, 121, 2265-2270  
“Inter and Intramolecular Stereoselective Protonation of Enols”, Zimmerman, H. E.; Wang, P., J. Org. Chem. 2002, 69, 9216-9226. 
"Triplet Photochemistry of Vinyl Cyclopropenes; Mechanistic and Exploratory Organic Photochemistry",  Zimmerman, H. E., J Org. Chem. 2009, 73, 1247-1251. .

References

External links
 Howard Zimmerman: A Defining Influence on Organic Chemistry
 H.E. Zimmerman group homepage
 EPA Report, Porter Medal, Career
 IAPS Report, Porter Metal, Career 
 Awards
 Moebius-Hueckel and the Woodward-Hofmann theories; Chemical and Engineering News
 Science article
 Yale Chittenden Award
 ACS Flack Norris Awards
  AIC Chemical Pioneer Awards
 Richard S. Givens, "Howard E. Zimmerman", Biographical Memoirs of the National Academy of Sciences (2015)

20th-century American chemists
Members of the United States National Academy of Sciences
1926 births
2012 deaths
Photochemistry
People from Connecticut
University of Wisconsin–Madison faculty
United States Army personnel of World War II
United States Army soldiers